Ladislavella is a genus of gastropods belonging to the family Lymnaeidae.

The species of this genus are found in Eurasia and America.

Species:

Ladislavella apicina 
Ladislavella arctica 
Ladislavella atkaensis 
Ladislavella bonnevillensis 
Ladislavella catascopium 
Ladislavella contracta 
Ladislavella elodes 
Ladislavella elrodi 
Ladislavella elrodiana 
Ladislavella emarginata 
Ladislavella exilis 
Ladislavella gabbii 
Ladislavella hinkleyi 
Ladislavella idahoensis 
Ladislavella kennicotti 
Ladislavella liogyra 
Ladislavella meekiana 
Ladislavella mighelsi 
Ladislavella neopalustris 
Ladislavella newmarchi 
Ladislavella occulta 
Ladislavella oronoensis 
Ladislavella petoskeyensis 
Ladislavella shumardi 
Ladislavella terebra 
Ladislavella traskii 
Ladislavella utahensis 
Ladislavella walkeriana 
Ladislavella woodruffi

References

Lymnaeidae